DeskTube was a desktop application that allows users to browse and search YouTube videos, access  Twitter and Facebook accounts all from the same location. Founded in 2007, DeskTube is built with Adobe AIR, which users must download first in order to utilize the program.

DeskTube and many other programs are moving to a different technological way of managing social media for different types of users.  In 2009, DeskTube was found by The Washington Post as a much easier way to surf YouTube content. Instead of using a web browser, many  companies are moving to applications that access the internet.

History 
DeskTube was founded in June 2007. Damon, a programmer, decided that YouTube would be a lot better experience through the use of an application. Instead of logging onto their web browser each time, users could just launch the application and immediately access their media information.

References

External links 
 

Desktop widgets